Sanquin District 3 is one of 16 districts of Sinoe County, Liberia. As of 2008, the population was 3,174.

References

Districts of Liberia
Sinoe County